Sang Lan (born 11 June 1981) is a former Chinese gymnast and television personality. She is currently a student and advocates for improved conditions for disabled people within China.

Athletic career and injury
Sang achieved excellence in gymnastics at a young age, winning the all-around and every single event final at the 1991 Zhejiang Province Championships. By 1995, she was competing nationally. Sang was one of China's strongest vaulters, placing second on the event at the 1995 Chinese Nationals, and gaining championship in 1997. While she never represented China at the Olympics or World Gymnastics Championships, she did compete at the 1996 and 1997 American Cup meets, and was selected for the 1998 Goodwill Games team.

In New York City at the Goodwill Games in July 1998, during warm-ups for the vault event final, Sang fell while she was performing a timer (a simple vault, used by the athlete to familiarize herself with the apparatus and warm up). She could not raise herself from the mat, and was taken to Nassau University Medical Center (NUMC), a Level I trauma center in East Meadow. She underwent spinal realignment, and cervical spine fusion, but the injury to her spinal cord was extensive, and left her paralysed from the mid-chest down.

Sang remained in New York City for almost a year, receiving rehabilitation at Mount Sinai Hospital. Many celebrities, including Leonardo DiCaprio, Celine Dion and Christopher Reeve visited and offered their support; she was also invited to participate in the New Year's Eve festivities in Times Square as an honored guest.

Twelve years after her fall, Sang claimed that her fall had been caused by the coach of another team, who had walked into the vault area to remove a mattress after her push-off. Sang said she mentioned it when she was sent to hospital, but Chinese officials apparently dismissed her accusation, saying she had brain damage. Sang has said she is preparing to sue the event's organisers, now that she is "old enough to stand up for herself." She also accused the Chinese National Gymnastics team for cruelly abandoning her after she was paralysed.

Advocacy
Since returning to China, Sang has become a celebrity and a disability advocate. A television miniseries about her life was produced in the late 1990s; she was portrayed by her former gymnastics teammate Mo Huilan. Sang also held her own show, Sang Lan Olympics 2008  on STAR TV, a Mandarin-language television channel. She was an ambassador for Beijing's successful 2008 Olympics bid and was selected as an Olympic relay torchbearer.

Sang was later a student at Peking University. She has continued a rigorous physical therapy regimen and has regained some use of her arms and hands. She has also expressed an interest in returning to competitive sports and hoped to represent China as a table tennis player at the 2008 Summer Paralympics.

Personal life
In 2013, Sang married Huang Jian (黄健) who was a former fencer in the Chinese national team. The couple had a son born a year later.

Competitive history

References

1981 births
Living people
Chinese female artistic gymnasts
Sportspeople from Ningbo
People with paraplegia
Gymnasts from Zhejiang
Competitors at the 1998 Goodwill Games